Chrysocercops castanopsidis is a moth of the family Gracillariidae. It is known from Japan (Honshū, Iriomote, Isigaki, Okinawa and Shikoku).

The wingspan is about 6.2–8 mm.

The larvae feed on Castanopsis cuspidata, Castanopsis sieboldii, Lithocarpus glaber and Pasania glabra. They probably mine the leaves of their host plant.

References

Chrysocercops
Moths of Japan
Moths described in 1988